The 2001 Belarusian Premier League was the 11th season of top-tier football in Belarus. It started on April 11 and ended on November 7, 2001. Slavia Mozyr were the defending champions.

Team changes from 2000 season
Due to league reduction from 16 to 14 teams, three worst placed teams in 2000 – Lida, Torpedo-Kadino Mogilev and Kommunalnik Slonim relegated to the First League, while only one team, winners of 2000 First League Molodechno, replaced them. Molodechno changed their name to Molodechno-2000 following the promotion. Naftan-Devon Novopolotsk shortened their name to Naftan Novopolotsk midway through 2001 season.

Overview
Belshina Bobruisk won their 1st champions title and qualified for the next season's Champions League. The championship runners-up Dinamo Minsk and 2001-02 Cup winners Gomel qualified for UEFA Cup. Teams finished on the last two places, Naftan Novopolotsk and Vedrich-97 Rechitsa relegated to the First League.

Teams and venues

Table

Results

Belarusian clubs in European Cups

Top scorers

See also
2001 Belarusian First League
2000–01 Belarusian Cup
2001–02 Belarusian Cup

External links
RSSSF

Belarusian Premier League seasons
1
Belarus
Belarus